Charles Fisk may refer to:

 Charles Brenton Fisk, American organ builder
 C. B. Fisk, Fisk's organ building company
 Charles Joseph Fisk, American judge
 Charles Fiske, American bishop

See also 
 Fisk (surname)